Sand Bridge State Park is a Pennsylvania state park on  in Lewis Township, Union County, Pennsylvania in the United States. The park is the smallest state park in Pennsylvania and consists of a picnic area just off Pennsylvania Route 192. It has three picnic pavilions that were built by the Civilian Conservation Corps during the Great Depression. Rapid Run, a trout stream that is stocked  by the Pennsylvania Fish and Boat Commission, flows through Sand Bridge State Park. The park attracted 17,000 visitors in 2008. The name Sand Bridge remains a mystery. No one, according to the parks official website knows why the area is known as Sand Bridge. The park is surrounded by Bald Eagle State Forest and became a Pennsylvania State park in 1978.

References

External links

  

State parks of Pennsylvania
Protected areas established in 1978
Civilian Conservation Corps in Pennsylvania
Parks in Union County, Pennsylvania
Protected areas of Union County, Pennsylvania
1978 establishments in Pennsylvania